|}

The County Handicap Hurdle is a Premier Handicap National Hunt hurdle race in Great Britain which is open to horses aged five years or older. It is run on the New Course at Cheltenham over a distance of about 2 miles and 1 furlong (2 miles and 179 yards, or 3,382 metres), and during its running there are eight hurdles to be jumped. It is a handicap race, and it is scheduled to take place each year during the Cheltenham Festival in March.

History
The County Hurdle was established in 1920, and its inaugural winner was Trespasser, ridden by George Duller. Its title between 1995 and 2016 was the Vincent O'Brien County Handicap Hurdle in honour of Vincent O'Brien, an Irish racehorse trainer who retired in 1994. During his career O'Brien recorded a total of twenty-three victories at the Cheltenham festival.

For many years the County Hurdle was traditionally the last race to be run at the Festival. However, a new running order was announced ahead of the 2009 meeting, and it is now the second race on the final day. The race held Grade 3 status until 2022 and was reclassified as a Premier Handicap from the 2023 running when Grade 3 was renamed by the British Horseracing Authority.

Records
Most successful horse since 1946:
 no horse has won this race more than once since 1946

Leading jockey since 1946 (4 wins):
 Ruby Walsh – Sporazene (2004), Desert Quest (2006), American Trilogy (2009), Final Approach (2011)

Leading trainer since 1946 (6 wins):
 Willie Mullins – Thousand Stars (2010), Final Approach (2011), Wicklow Brave (2015), Arctic Fire (2017), Saint Roi (2020), State Man (2022)

List of renewals
 Weights given in stones and pounds.

See also
 Horse racing in Great Britain
 List of British National Hunt races

References

 pedigreequery.com – Vincent O'Brien County Handicap Hurdle – Cheltenham.
 racenewsonline.co.uk – Racenews Archive (21 February 2008).
 

National Hunt races in Great Britain
Cheltenham Racecourse
National Hunt hurdle races
Recurring sporting events established in 1920
1920 establishments in England